Nigg Bay in Aberdeen is located to the east of the southern part of the City of Aberdeen.

Industry
Aberdeen harbour are planning to develop the bay into a harbour to fill their need for more room. They will make improvements to the local infrastructure as they do so.

References

External links 
Gazetteer for Scotland

Landforms of Aberdeen
Bays of Scotland
Bays of Aberdeenshire